Victor Jörgensen (12 June 1924 – 29 August 2001) was a boxer from Denmark. He competed for Denmark in the 1952 Summer Olympics held in Helsinki, Finland in the welterweight event where he finished in third place. He was born in Hjørring.

References
Victor Jörgensen's profile at Sports Reference.com

1924 births
2001 deaths
Olympic boxers of Denmark
Olympic bronze medalists for Denmark
Boxers at the 1952 Summer Olympics
Olympic medalists in boxing
Danish male boxers
Medalists at the 1952 Summer Olympics
People from Hjørring
Welterweight boxers
Sportspeople from the North Jutland Region
20th-century Danish people
21st-century Danish people